El Jedid Mosque is a mosque in Tunis, Tunisia, located in Medina area of the city.

References

Mosques in the medina of Tunis
Religious buildings and structures completed in 1726
18th-century mosques
1726 establishments in Africa
1726 establishments in the Ottoman Empire
18th-century establishments in Tunisia